Anangpur is a historical village located near Faridabad in Haryana, India. Anangpur forms a geographical triangle along with Mehrauli and Tugluqabad. It was the earliest settlement of the Tomara dynasty. Anangpur was the capital of the Tomar king, Anangpal Tomar I.

History

Tomara dynasty (8th - 11th century CE) 

Anangpal I, first king of Tomara dynasty (c.736- 1052 CE), declared himself an independent ruler and established the Tomar Dynasty of Delhi in the early 8th century. He built his capital in this village and expanded his kingdom from there. He is said to have built numerous palaces and temples during his reign, the majority of which are diminished now. Last king of this dynasty was Anangpal Tomar (Anangpal II), who had built Delhi's Lal Kot, which was later renovated by Chauhan ruler and also came to be known as the Qila Rai Pithora. Tomara dynasty were overthrown by Chahamanas of Shakambhari, last Chahamana or Chauhan king was Prithviraj Chauhan, Qila Rai Pithora (earlier called Lal Kot) is named after him.

The capital of Tomars changed a few times during the course of 457 years they ruled in the northern India. The first capital of the Tomar empire was Anangpur while the last one was Dhillikapuri (Delhi, Lal Kot).

Chauhan dynasty (12th century CE) 

The Tomara's rule was followed by that of the Chahamanas and the mlechchha Sahavadina (Shihab ad-Din).

Paleolithic sites (100,000 BP)

Group of 43 sites 

Anangpur group of paleolithic sites (AGPS), discovered In 1986, is a cluster of 43 prehistoric sites with rock art (paintings) in the area of historic Anangpur village, Mangar Bani paleolithic site found in 2021 might be extension of Anangpur sites.

In the forested area where the Surajkund and the Anagpur Dam are located, ancient Stone Age relics have been found which are microliths (stone tools) belonging to lower paleolithic era. These were found at 43 sites from Ankhir (a village 17 km east of Mangar Bani) in south to north along Anangpur-Angnpur Dam-Surajkund-Tughlaqabad axis. These sites are on the 'Tughlaqabad-Surajkund Road' and south of 'Surajkund-Faridabad Road', on Anangpur hills, and on Ankhir hill, and on the road embracing the low ridge from Faridabad (Ankhir) to Surajkund. From a study of the prehistoric findings along the ridges of Surajkund reservoir, Anagpur Dam, and around Delhi and adjoining parts of Haryana, it has been inferred that the southern hilly area of Delhi and Haryana was environmentally suited for pre-historic man to settle here.

Protected status 

As of 31 July 2021, Head of HAD, Ashok Khemka, informed that proposal to notify this entire area as protected archaeological site has been sent by Haryana Archaeological Dept (HAD) to Govt of Haryana (GoH), and HAD is awaiting gazette notification by the GoH after which this site will become legally protected. Meanwhile, district land and revenue administration of Faridabad was undertaking ground truthing exercise, to verify the data, to ascertain the landscape and confirm the type and ownership of the land, which will be sent to HAD to help with attainment of protected status and consequent conservation.

Conservation 

Khemka asserted that HAD will engage National Research Laboratory for Conservation of Cultural Property (NRLC) Lucknow, Birbal Sahni Institute of Palaeosciences (BSIP) Lucknow, Physical Research Laboratory (PRL) Ahmedabad for conservation of rockart and paintings. Khemka asserted that the whole area will be extensively surveyed to find any additional sites, entire area of Delhi South Ridge of Aravali in Haryana between Gurugram and Faridabad will be mapped and each site will be GPS tagged. Large scale scientific excavations, scientific dating of paintings and excavated sediments will be undertaken.

Other similar sites

Misolithic sites with tools, cave art and paintings are Anangpur caves and Mangar Bani Caves (Gurugram) in Delhi NCR, Bhimbetka rock shelters (Bhopal) and Pahargarh caves (Morena) in Madhya Pradesh.

Tomara monuments (8th-11th century CE)

Anangpur Dam (8th century CE) 

Anangpur Dam is an Indian hydraulic engineering structure built during his reign and the ruins of a fortification can also be seen around it. Surajkund, a large masonry tank, can be found in this area dating from the 9th century and was used to collect water from the Anangpur Dam and the surrounding areal.

Surajkund 

Surajkund, a  10th century reservoir on Southern Delhi Ridge of Aravalli range in Faridabad, was built by the king Surajpal of the Tomara dynasty in the 10th century. Surajpal Tomar, a younger son of Anangpal Tomar - the ruler of Delhi, was a sun worshipper and he had therefore built a Sun temple on its western bank.

Surajkund is known for its annual fair Surajkund International Craft Mela, 2015 edition of this fair was visited by 1.2 million visitors including 160,000 foreigners with more than 20 countries participating in it.

Present day Anangpur village

Administration and demography 

Present Anangpur (Postal Index Number 121003) has a population of around 11000 people, an area of 3.55 square kilometers, and a population density of 3332 per Kilometer square. The population consists mainly of Gurjar Community . This Village has Majority of Bhadana Gotra Gurjar. There are other gotra of gurjar like tomar and chhawadi gurjar.

Hari Parbat Mandir 

Anangpur has a replica of the temple of Mata Sharika Chakreshwar Hari Parbat Srinagar. Hari Parbat Mandir Anangpur is situated at one of the hillocks adjoining the Anangpur village. The temple was built with the contribution of  Padma Shri  Jagan Nath Kaul, who was the President of the Kashmiri Sewak Samaj, Faridabad  and All India Kashmiri Samaj. The temple  'Hari Parbat' Anangpur is a place where 'Kashmiri Pandits' in and around Delhi observe their 'Nav Reh' festival.

See also 
 History of Delhi
 History of Haryana
 History of India
Current Situation of Anangpur Village
Anangpur is a Biggest village that is connected with Delhi. Village is divided into various mohallas.
Raja Mohalla
Ghati Tala Mohalla
Vigrah Mohalla
Bich Patiya Mohalla
Domka Mohalla
Tota Mohalla
Mohal Chauda Mohalla
Jhodiya Mohalla
Ahla Mohalla
Milkoniya Mohalla
Dhumaspur Mohalla
÷There are Various Farm houses

Educational Institutions
Saint Brij Mohan School affiliated by CBSE
Government Senior Secondary School
SOS Nursing Mohalla
Manav Rachna International University

Anangpur Village has biggest chaupal.

Renowned Industry
Mount Kailash Water packaging
Various ware houses

Various Artists are from this village

Bhai Vinod Bhadana Acted in Sultan Movie.
Mohit Bhadana is a Renowned kabaddi Player
This Village has also given great politician to Indian national politics like Avtar Singh Bhadana and Kartar Singh Bhadana.Manmohan Singh Bhadana is a new charming star of regional politics in Faridabad Haryana.

Few families have prestigious titles before the mughal emperor like Jalidar.
Family of jaildar's are presented in this village but they are now a part of modern life style.
Chaudhary Rami Bhadana Jaildar died in 2022. He was more than 85 years and he was a prominent speaker and good expert of folklore of haryana. He used to smoke hukka. Hukka is part of gurjar culture. Desi Hukka need dung flame so in this baithak till he alive 24x7 flame use to burn for hukka it service was available for all of the people or village people who go and sit in chaupal.
Youths of this village are health conscious so wrestling and serving to nation after joining defence is big aim of youth.

References

Citations

Bibliography 

 

Archaeology in Haryana
Caves containing pictograms in India
Monuments and memorials in Haryana
History of Haryana
History of Delhi
Indian painting
 
Protected areas of Haryana
Tourist attractions in Haryana
Ridges of India
Aravalli Range
Villages in Faridabad district
Faridabad district